Harry Rankin (May 8, 1920 – February 26, 2002) was a Vancouver lawyer and long term member of the Vancouver City Council.

Early years
Rankin was born Harry Riffkin in Vancouver to secular Jewish immigrants from Ukraine. His father worked at a factory while his mother grew up in Glasgow's working class Jewish community.

At 14, Rankin dropped out of secondary school to work in a bakery and through the trade union he got involved in politics. During World War Two he served in the Canadian Army with Vancouver's Seaforth Highlanders of Canada. He attained the rank of sergeant and was wounded on 23 May 1944 during the Battle of the Hitler Line.

Rankin married a Jewish divorcee, and they had a son, Phil Rankin, who went on to become a Vancouver lawyer.

A documentary film, the Rankin File, was premiered in 2018, which was a biography and a background to the 1986 Vancouver mayoral election between Harry Rankin and Gordon Campbell.

Law
After the war he completed his secondary education and pursued undergraduate studies at the University of British Columbia, where he also earned a law degree. During his time at U.B.C., he joined the Communist University Club, briefly serving as its vice-president.

Communists were banned from joining the bar and the Law Society of British Columbia interviewed Rankin at length prior to admitting him to the bar about his views on God, whether he would defend his country if attacked, and whether he was a member of the Communist Party of Canada, then called the Labor-Progressive Party, something he was able to deny as the Communist University Club was an independent and unaffiliated organization. In the wake of the Law Society refusing to admit Gordon Martin to the bar on account of his being an avowed communist, Rankin had to sign a declaration that he was not a communist prior to being allowed to join. He went on to become head of the Law Society in 1979 (a position then known as Treasurer, later known as President).

As a lawyer, Rankin fought for and helped establish the province's legal aid system. In 1950 he was one of the founding members of a committee that created a list of lawyers who were willing to take on cases, mostly pro bono, preceding the establishment of the BC Legal Aid Society by 20 years.

Rankin worked as a criminal lawyer and labour lawyer, and he spent a significant amount of time working for First Nations clients, most notably in the much-publicised case of Fred Quilt.

Politics
Rankin ran for office more than a dozen times before being elected to the Vancouver City Council in 1966 as the sole independent alderman on a council dominated by the conservative Non-Partisan Association. Vancouver's aldermen were elected through an "at large" system rather than by ward meaning voters from wealthier neighbourhoods were able to monopolise council elections and that only candidates who could afford a citywide campaign had a chance of being elected. Rankin helped form the Committee of Progressive Electors (COPE) as a left wing civic political party and it subsequently pushed for a ward-based electoral system to be introduced in Vancouver, culminating in a referendum in October 1973, at which the ward proposal was defeated.

Rankin was a 20-year veteran of city council when he ran for mayor in 1986, losing to Gordon Campbell.  He returned to city council as an alderman in the subsequent election and remained on the body until his retirement from politics in 1993.

He died on February 26, 2002, from a heart attack, aged 81.

Rankin's widow, Connie Fogal, is the former leader of the Canadian Action Party. Rankin's son, Phil Rankin, continues in his father's footsteps as a lawyer and advocate for legal aid. His grandson, Micah Rankin, is a law professor at Thompson Rivers University. His nephew, Lee Rankin is a lawyer and was a long-time councillor in Burnaby, British Columbia and was a federal Liberal candidate in 2000 and a BC Liberal candidate in the 2009 provincial election.

References

External links

1920 births
2002 deaths
Canadian communists
Lawyers in British Columbia
Coalition of Progressive Electors councillors
Canadian Army personnel of World War II
Seaforth Highlanders of Canada soldiers
Canadian people of Ukrainian-Jewish descent
Canadian socialists of Ukrainian descent